The Nissan Cube is a mini MPV produced by carmaker Nissan between 1998 to 2019. Initially sold only in Japan, the Cube was sold in North American markets from 2009 to 2014, and in European markets from 2009 to 2011. In Japan, it was exclusive to Nissan Red Stage dealerships. It is a slightly larger load-carrying alternative to the Nissan Micra hatchback. While production for the North American market ended in 2014, the Japanese-market Cube lasted until December 2019.

First generation (Z10; 1998)

The first-generation Cube was introduced in 1998. It shared the same platform as the Nissan Micra (known as the March in Japan and Southeast Asia), as well as the same 1.3 L inline-four engine. A continuously variable transmission and four-wheel drive were optional. The Cube covered the gap in the Nissan lineup between the March and the Sunny.

Second generation (Z11; 2002) 

The second-generation Cube was released in 2002 with a larger interior than the previous model. The combination of angled and curved surfaces was based on the third-generation Micra/March, powered by a 1.4 L I4 engine. The model included the "e4WD" system as an option, which transfers power to the rear wheels when the front wheels spin via a small electric motor on the rear underside of the floor. The electrically powered system allows for reduced drivetrain drag in FWD mode. A slightly longer three row model, the Cube Cubic (stylized as Cube³) went on sale in September 2003.

When equipped with a CVT, the steering wheel button controls and the sport wheel button on the dash panel are located next to the hazard flasher switch. In mid-2005, the cube had an optional upgrade with the new HR-series 1.5 L engine from the Nissan Tiida.

All Cube models have optional extras including an Ion filter (Air Ioniser) for cleaning the air and Nissan's 'smart key' which allows the driver to enter the car without having to use a key. Other options include a sunroof, 12 different styles of front grille and satellite navigation. Other specific models also have different styles of bodykits and fender flares. They come with optional 14 or 15 inch wheels and the Autech versions (Rider, Cube3 and GT models) with chrome styling and special seat covering.

The second-generation Cube was imported and sold in Malaysia by Mitsuoka as the M-Box and later the MPV. This model was different from other Mitsuoka models in that it had no major differences to the original car, and simply had a different grille and a couple of other exterior parts. The M-Box and MPV were exclusive to Malaysia.

Third generation (Z12; 2009) 

The third-generation Cube was revealed for the first time at the Los Angeles Auto Show, on November 19, 2008. It was the first generation of the Cube to be officially exported beyond Japan, including to the European and North American markets. The Cube went on sale in Japan on November 19, 2008, and the U.S. on May 5, 2009.

The updated model has more rounded and curved styling in the rear bumper area, in the asymmetrical rear window which wraps around to the passenger side, and in the driver and front-passenger windows. The tailgate is side-hinged to swing open like a door, rather than upward like a hatch. The hatch hinge is on the right side for countries with left-hand traffic such as Japan and the UK; on the left side for right-hand traffic markets such as North America.

Seating capacity remains at five. According to Nissan designers, the interior is inspired by the 'enveloping curves of a jacuzzi to promote a comfortable and social atmosphere.' Design cues include a water-ripple motif that appears in the headliner and is repeated in details like the speaker covers and cup holders. Nissan has developed an extended line of accessories for Cube to encourage personalization. These include multicolor appliqués that can be placed around air vents and window switches, utility hooks and elastic bands in different colors, variable color LED accent lighting for the footwell and cup holders, and a sculptured piece of color-coordinated shag carpet that sits in a shallow well on the top of the dash.

Europe uses the 
HR 1.6 petrol and 1.5 dCi Diesel. All are also used for the Nissan Note and Tiida/Versa. Depending on the engine, it is available with a 5- or 6-speed manual transmission or Nissan's automatic Continuously Variable Transmission. The Cube is capable of averaging  in Japan and doing  city, and  highway with its Xtronic CVT transmission. The e-4WD trim contains an electric rear wheel drive motor to assist the gasoline engine powered front wheels.

As a result of power shortages in Japan caused by the 2011 Tōhoku earthquake and tsunami, the 2012 Cube made a delayed appearance in the United States in January 2012. The 2012 model had no mechanical or styling changes, but Nissan did introduce a special-edition version, the S Indigo with a navigation system, rear-view monitor, upgraded audio system, intelligent key and upgraded wheels. New paint colors were available: Pearl White, Brilliant Silver, Gun Metallic, Cayenne Red, and Bali Blue. New equipment features were added to certain trim levels. Pricing of the base model went up $240.

In early 2011, Nissan announced the Z12 Cube was to be withdrawn from sale in the UK and the rest of Europe, following its disappointing sales performance. Nissan cited a poor exchange rate as one of the reasons why the model failed to be competitive.

The Cube was discontinued in the North American market at the end of the 2014 model year, due to poor sales. Production for the Japanese market continued until at least December 2019.

EV-02 (2008)
It is a test vehicle with 80 kW motor and lithium-ion batteries.

Nissan claimed the production version would be introduced in 2010 would have a unique bodystyle and is not based on any existing Nissan model, which became the Nissan Leaf.

Marketing
Nissan provided visitors at the 2008 LA Auto Show with a brochure featuring the car using augmented reality technology by Total Immersion. The brochure is held up to a webcam of which various 3D models of the vehicle will pop out offering views of the car's exterior and interior in real-time interaction with the brochure.

To promote the first Cube model to arrive in Canada, Nissan Canada ran a contest in early and mid-2009 to give away 50 Nissan Cubes to "creative Canadians". The marketing campaign, called 'hypercube', picked 500 Canadians to compete for 50 Cubes by showing their creative talents. The winners received their Cubes at events held in Toronto, Vancouver, and Montreal.

2010 recall
A recall was announced in the United States by Nissan on July 21, 2010, that affected 46,000 MY 2009 and 2010 Cube vehicles for failing to comply with Federal Motor Vehicle Safety Standard (FMVSS) 301, "Fuel System Integrity", due to excessive fuel leakage after a rear-end collision.

Awards and recognition
Kelley Blue Book named the Nissan Cube one of its Top 10 Coolest Cars Under $18,000 and also as one of its Top 10 Road Trip Cars.
Nissan Cube rated a Top Safety Pick by the Insurance Institute for Highway Safety (IIHS).
Automobile Design of the Year Award
AAA Top vehicle picks for dog owners
Nissan Cube won a AutoPacific's Best in Class Vehicle Satisfaction Award.
Nissan Cube won the Japan Good Design Long Life Design Award of 2018.

See also
 List of Nissan vehicles

References

External links

Nissan Cube website (in Japanese)
 2009 Nissan Cube USA
Japanese Imports Safety Recalls for Nissan Cube

Cars introduced in 1998
2000s cars
2010s cars
All-wheel-drive vehicles
Front-wheel-drive vehicles
Mini MPVs
Cube
Vehicles with CVT transmission